Andaman and Nicobar Territorial Congress Committee (ANTCC) is the wing of Indian National Congress in the parts of Andaman and Nicobar Islands.
Kuldeep Rai Sharma is the present president of Andaman & Nicobar Territorial Congress Committee.

References

Indian National Congress by state or union territory